Princess Sophie Maria Friederike Auguste Leopoldine Alexandrine Ernestine Albertine Elisabeth of Saxony, Duchess of Saxony (Full German name: Prinzessin Sophie Maria Friederike Auguste Leopoldine Alexandrine Ernestine Albertine Elisabeth von Sachsen, Herzogin zu Sachsen) (15 March 1845, Dresden, Kingdom of Saxony – 9 March 1867, Munich, Kingdom of Bavaria) was the eighth and youngest child of John of Saxony and his wife Amalie Auguste of Bavaria and a younger sister of Albert of Saxony and George of Saxony. Through her marriage to Duke Karl-Theodor in Bavaria, Sophie was a member of the House of Wittelsbach and a Duchess in Bavaria.

Marriage and issue

Sophie married Duke Karl-Theodor in Bavaria, fifth child and third-eldest son of Duke Maximilian Joseph in Bavaria and his wife Princess Ludovika of Bavaria, on 11 February 1865 in Dresden. Sophie and Karl-Theodor had one child:

 Duchess Amalie in Bavaria (24 December 1865 – 26 May 1912)

Illness and death
Childbirth caused severe respiratory problems for Sophie, which progressively weakened her, although she managed to recover. However, a year later she contracted a severe case of influenza that she could not overcome. Sophie died shortly before her 22nd birthday on 9 March 1867 and was interred at Tegernsee Abbey.

Ancestry

References

Erika Bestenreiner. The Empress Sissi. Milan, Mondadori, 2003.

1845 births
1867 deaths
House of Wettin
Saxon princesses
Nobility from Dresden
Duchesses in Bavaria
Deaths from influenza
German Roman Catholics
Albertine branch
Daughters of kings